En brazos de la mujer madura, loosely based on the novel In Praise of Older Women, is a 1997 Spanish coming-of-age film set during and after the Spanish Civil War. As well as recounting the amorous education of a young man, it evokes the political and social conditions of the time.

Plot
When war breaks out in 1936, the boys at a Catholic boarding school in Republican territory are sent home. Andres is one of these boys. Finding that his widowed mother's flat in Gerona is requisitioned and she is far away in La Coruña, he decides to rejoin her by bicycle. Reaching the Aragon front, he is stopped by an Anarchist unit under the charismatic commander Dávalos and is conscripted to help the cook Honorio, who is having an affair with a peasant woman Pilar. Also stopped are a wealthy Englishman and his American wife, la Condesa, for whom Andrés acts as interpreter and is rewarded. He is then sent to safety in Barcelona where he starts an affair with Julia, the virgin daughter of the house, but is evicted before consummation. To live, he starts dealing on the black market and one night tries a prostitute, but she is so bored that he leaves in disgust. The war over, his mother comes back and is set up in a flat by her Falangist lover Victor. Above them lives a married woman Marta, who lends Andrés books and starts an affair. But she and her well-off husband were Republicans and are taken away by the secret police. In the street, Andrés sees Pilar, the working-class girl from the front, and they have a night together. Then at a concert he falls for Bobi, an Italian violinist, and they have a brief idyll. Her orchestra's next engagement is in Vichy France and at the frontier station of Canfranc Andrés rejoins her.

Cast
 Juan Diego Botto - Andrés
 Miguel Ángel García - Andrés (15 yrs)
 Faye Dunaway - la Condesa
 Joanna Pacula - Marta
 Carme Elias - Irene
 Rosana Pastor - Pilar
 Ingrid Rubio - Julia
 Florence Pernel - Bobi
 Ángel de Andrés López - Víctor
 Ramón Barea - Peciña
  - Miss Mozar
 Nancho Novo - Honorio
 Ralph Riach - Conde

See also
 In Praise of Older Women (1978)

External links

1997 films
1990s English-language films
English-language Spanish films
1990s Italian-language films
1990s Spanish-language films
Films based on Hungarian novels
Spanish Civil War films
Spanish coming-of-age films
Spanish remakes of foreign films
Remakes of Canadian films
Films with screenplays by Rafael Azcona
1990s coming-of-age films
1990s Spanish films